Nicolás Marcelo Méndez (born November 2, 1992) is an Argentine volleyball player, member of the Argentina men's national volleyball team and French club Paris Volley, participant of the Olympic Games, (Tokyo 2020). His father, Marcelo Méndez is the current head coach of the Argentine national team.

Career

Méndez made his first major world tournament debut on the senior national team in 2019. He was named to the 2020 Summer Olympic squad.

On the professional league level, he currently plays for Paris Volley.

References

1992 births
Living people
Volleyball players from Buenos Aires
Argentine men's volleyball players
Olympic volleyball players of Argentina
Argentine Champions of men's volleyball
Argentine expatriate sportspeople in France
Expatriate volleyball players in France
Argentine expatriate sportspeople in Spain
Expatriate volleyball players in Spain
Volleyball players at the 2020 Summer Olympics
Volleyball players at the 2010 Summer Youth Olympics
Medalists at the 2020 Summer Olympics
Olympic bronze medalists for Argentina
Olympic medalists in volleyball